Silver King Camp, also known as Fredericton, is a ghost town located in the West Kootenay region of British Columbia.  The town is located on Toad Mountain near Nelson and was founded in the 1880s. It had a high elevation, at around 1,813 meters above sea level. In 1887, silver ore was discovered on Toad Mountain, and a mine was created called the Silver King which was owned by the Hall family of Nelson. A small town, named Fredericton, grew around the workings of the mine.  By 1898, Silver King Camp had a population of 190.  The Silver King mine was the greatest exporter of silver ore to the Nelson Smelter for two decades.  A forest fire destroyed Silver King Camp and today little remains of its town. The town had few businesses, but the most notable of these was the Toad Mountain Hotel.

References

Ghost towns in British Columbia